Arahan is a 2004 South Korean action film directed by Ryoo Seung-wan and starring his brother Ryoo Seung-bum along with Yoon So-yi, Ahn Sung-ki and Jung Doo-hong. The film was a relative commercial success, selling over 2 million tickets domestically, but wasn't as well received by critics as Ryoo Seung-wan's previous films.

Plot
When a thief driving a motorcycle steals a purse of a pedestrian, the clumsy, naive and honest rookie policeman Sang-hwan runs after him, but Eui-jin, specialist in martial arts, captures the criminal swang and Sang-hwan is severely injured. She brings Sang-hwan to her home, where the six Masters of Tao heal him and believe that he has a powerful Qi, the spiritual energy of the universe, and could be a powerful warrior. Sang-hwan begins his training to ascend to a Maruchi, while the evil and ambitious Heuk-woon is accidentally released from his imprisonment. The powerful Heuk-woon attacks the masters, searching for a key that they protect, which would permit him to become an Arahan and dominate the world. When the masters are defeated, Sang-hwan and Eui-jin are the only and last hope to mankind.

Cast
 Ryoo Seung-bum as Sang-hwan
 Yoon So-yi as Eui-jin
 Ahn Sung-ki as Ja-woon
 Jung Doo-hong as Heuk-woon
 Kim Su-hyeon as the TV host
 Kim Hyo-seon as the TV host
 Yoon Joo-sang as Mu-woon
 Kim Ji-young as Banya
 Baek Chan-gi as Seol-woon
 Kim Young-in as Yeok-bong
 Park Yoon-bae as Officer Choi
 Lee Won as Seon-dong
 Bong Tae-gyu as Officer Bong
 Lee Oi-soo as Baek Poong
 Ahn Gil-kang as Mr. Gang

External links 
 
 
 
 Kyu Hyun Kim's review at Koreanfilm.org

2004 films
2000s action comedy films
South Korean action comedy films
South Korean martial arts films
Films set in Seoul
Films shot in Seoul
Films directed by Ryoo Seung-wan
2000s Korean-language films
2004 martial arts films
2004 comedy films
2000s South Korean films